Stanley Charles Davies (24 April 1898 – 17 January 1972) was a Welsh professional footballer who played as a forward.

Early life
Davies was born in Chirk, working as a coal miner for a year as a teenager before becoming a footballer. He fought in World War I, serving with the Royal Welch Fusiliers on the Western Front and attained the rank of sergeant. Davies was wounded during the Battle of Cambrai and later transferred to the Army Signalling School, being awarded the Military Medal and the Croix de Guerre for his service.

Career
Having played for his hometown side Chirk prior to World War I, Davies turned professional with Rochdale in January 1919 but just three months later joined Preston North End for £800. After two years with Preston, Davies moved to Everton on 29 January 1921 for a fee of £4000, a club record for Preston at the time. He made his debut on 5 February 1921. His final match was on 5 November that year, and he then moved to West Bromwich Albion.

Later in his career he played for Birmingham, Cardiff City, Rotherham United (as player-manager) and Barnsley. He died in Birmingham in 1972.

References 

 
 

1898 births
1972 deaths
Welsh footballers
Wales international footballers
Association football forwards
Rochdale A.F.C. players
Preston North End F.C. players
Everton F.C. players
West Bromwich Albion F.C. players
Birmingham City F.C. players
Cardiff City F.C. players
Rotherham United F.C. players
Barnsley F.C. players
Welsh football managers
Rotherham United F.C. managers
People from Chirk
Sportspeople from Wrexham County Borough
British Army personnel of World War I
Recipients of the Military Medal
Recipients of the Croix de Guerre 1914–1918 (France)
Royal Welch Fusiliers soldiers
Chelmsford City F.C. non-playing staff